Brunson is a surname. Notable people with the surname include:

Alfred Brunson (1793-1882), American politician
Andrew Brunson (born 1968), American Presbyterian pastor in Turkey
Benjamin Wetherill Brunson (1823-1898), American politician
Doyle Brunson (born 1933), American poker player
Jalen Brunson (born 1996), American basketball player (son of Rick)
Michael Brunson (born 1940), political journalist
Ira B. Brunson (1815-1883), American politician
Quinta Brunson (born 1989), American writer, producer, comedian, and actress
Rick Brunson (born 1972), American basketball player and coach
Rebekkah Brunson (born 1981), American basketball player
T. J. Brunson (born 1997), American football player
Todd Brunson (born 1969), American poker player (son of Doyle)
Tyrone Brunson (disambiguation), multiple people